The 2005–06 UEFA Futsal Cup was the 20th edition of Europe's premier club futsal tournament and the 5th edition under the current UEFA Futsal Cup format.

Preliminary round

First qualifying round

Group 1

Group 2

Group 3

Group 4

Group 5

Group 6

Group 7

Group 8

Second qualifying round

Group A

Group B

Knockout stage

Semifinals

Final

External links
 uefa.com

UEFA Futsal Champions League
Cup